Mohammed Mahdi Al Tajir (born 26 December 1931) is a Bahrana-Emirati businessman based in the United Kingdom. He was the first United Arab Emirates ambassador to the United Kingdom and non resident ambassador to France. Al Tajir spends much of his time at his London home or at Keir House, his  Perthshire estate. He has interests in finance and property, and owns the Highland Spring bottled water company.

Al Tajir was named one of Scotland's richest men with wealth of £1.72 billion in the Sunday Times Rich List 2010.

Life

Mohammed Mahdi Al Tajir was born in December 1931 in Bahrain, and educated at Preston Grammar School in Lancashire. Al Tajir is married with five children. 

Al Tajir's 15,000 acre Blackford estate in Perthshire, Scotland is owned by his company Park Tower Holding Establishment, based in the tax haven of Liechtenstein. Al Tajir also owns London's Sheraton Park Tower Hotel at 101 Knightsbridge near Hyde Park and Mereworth Castle in Kent, which he purchased in 1976 for $1.2 million.

In the 1980s, he attempted to broker a peace deal in the Lebanese Civil War with his business partner Hani Salaam.

Al Tajir has an extensive collection of silver artifacts and carpets. In 1993 Al Tajir paid the record price for a piece of silver at auction, when he bought a 1736 silver chandelier made by Balthasar Friedrich Behrens for £2.27 million at Christie's in Monaco. 

Al Tajir formed a joint venture with Bonhams fine art auction house to open an office in Dubai.

Al Tajir's son, Maher al-Tajir, was found guilty of assaulting his girlfriend at Keir House in 2009.

Business career
Appointed head of customs in Dubai by Sheikh Rashid bin Saeed Al Maktoum, he became one of Sheikh Rashid's most trusted advisors and was made the first Ambassador of the United Arab Emirates to the United Kingdom when the UAE was founded in 1971. Under a thinly disguised name, Al Tajir's exploits as a negotiator were recorded in the 1976 novel Dubai by Robin Moore. 

In 1963, Al Tajir became director of Sheikh Rashid's Petroleum affairs and effectively the most powerful man in Dubai after Sheikh Rashid himself. Al Tajir lost or resigned his position in 1981 with the downfall of Sheikh Rashid's health and the waning of his personal power, with the ascedency of Shekih Rashid's sons. Al Tajir remained UAE ambassador to the United Kingdom until 1987. 

In London in the late 1960s, the Egyptian businessman Mohamed Al-Fayed was introduced to Al Tajir by Salim Abu Alwan, an Iraqi businessman. Al Tajir informed Al-Fayed that Dubai was penniless and needed to borrow £1 million for the future construction of modern harbour facilities. 

Al-Fayed secured a loan of £9 million from Imre Rochlitz, an American lawyer. Rochlitz's Jewish ancestry caused embarrassment to Al Tajir, and later caused Rochlitz to reject Al-Fayed's offer of a formal partnership. Al-Fayed earned £1.5 million commission from the contract for British engineering company Costain to carry out the improvement works to the port. Al-Fayed also assisted with securing the financing for the Dubai World Trade Centre. 

By the mid 1970s Costain had gained over £280 million of contracts thanks to Al-Fayed and Al Tajir. Al Tajir's influence in Dubai was waning by 1977, and Al-Fayed was excluded from the commission process for a new aluminium smelter, and the development of Jebel Ali, putting Costain's future profits at risk. In 1993 Al-Fayed was visited at his department store Harrods by Mohammed Alabbar, the director of Dubai's Department of Economic Development. Alabbar had been appointed by Sheikh Maktoum to eradicate the system of large commission payments from previous decades. Al Tajir was challenged in the British courts to repay his alleged excessive profits earned from the construction of Dubai's aluminium smelter, and Al-Fayed was targeted over his management contract of the Dubai World Trade Centre.

The construction of Dubai's aluminium smelter caused Al Tajir to fall out with Sheikh Rashid's sons. In the judgement of a British court case, Al Tajir conspired to defraud Dubai Aluminium of millions of US dollars in connivance with commodities trader Marc Rich, who owned a neighbouring property in Switzerland.

Al Tajir owns a glass-bottling company in Dubai and a private bank in the tax haven of the Cayman Islands.

References

External links
The Al Tajir trust

1931 births
Living people
Emirati businesspeople
Emirati billionaires
Emirati emigrants to the United Kingdom
Scottish billionaires
Emirati philanthropists
Emirati people of Bahraini descent
Ambassadors of the United Arab Emirates to the United Kingdom
Ambassadors of the United Arab Emirates to France
Emirati art collectors
People educated at Preston Grammar School
Naturalised citizens of the United Kingdom